Pelican West is the debut studio album by British new wave band Haircut One Hundred, released in February 1982 by Arista Records. It peaked at No. 2 on the UK Albums Chart and No. 31 on the Billboard 200, and was certified platinum by the British Phonographic Industry.

The album featured three hit singles: "Love Plus One", "Favourite Shirts (Boy Meets Girl)" and "Fantastic Day". It was reissued on CD in 1992, retitled as Pelican West Plus and including five bonus tracks.

Pelican West was included in the book 1001 Albums You Must Hear Before You Die.

Track listing

Original album

Pelican West Plus (1992)

Double CD reissue (1998, 2016)

Personnel
Credits are adapted from the album's liner notes.

Haircut One Hundred
 Nick Heyward – vocals, lead guitar, rhythm guitar
 Les Nemes – bass guitar
 Graham Jones – guitar
 Phil Smith – saxophone, brass arrangements
 Marc Fox – congas, percussion
 Blair Cunningham – drums

Additional musicians
Herschel Holder – trumpet
Dave Lord – trumpet
Vince Sullivan – trombone

Production
Bob Sargeant – production
Mark Dearnley – engineering
Dave Kemp – engineering
David Shortt – art direction
Gered Mankowitz – photography
Peter Hill – sleeve art
Karl Adams – management

Charts

Weekly charts

Year-end charts

Singles

Certifications

References

External links
Official Haircut 100 website

1982 debut albums
Haircut One Hundred albums
Arista Records albums
Albums produced by Bob Sargeant